Castagna is a restaurant in Portland, Oregon's Hosford-Abernethy neighborhood, in the United States.

History
The restaurant is owned by Monique Siu. Justin Woodward serves as executive chef, as of 2019. He has received five James Beard Award nominations. Wine Director Brent Braun was named on of Food & Wine Magazine's Sommeliers of the Year in 2017.

Prior to opening Olympia Provisions in 2009, owners Nate Tilden and Elias Cairo worked together at Castagna, where Cairo served as head chef.

In February 2020, the restaurant implemented a single 10-course menu. Castagna closed temporarily in March 2020, during the COVID-19 pandemic. In August, the restaurant began serving take-out dinners for two on Fridays and Saturdays, and the wine bar OK Omens started patio service.

Reception
In 2000, Castagna was named Restaurant of the Year. Michelle Lopez included Castagna in Eater Portland 2018 list of "Portland Special Occasion Destinations for Any Budget".

References

External links

 
 Castagna Restaurant at Zagat

Hosford-Abernethy, Portland, Oregon
Restaurants in Portland, Oregon
Year of establishment missing